Adrian John Hedley (born 8 December 1978) is a former English cricketer.  Hedley was a right-handed batsman who bowled right-arm medium pace.  He was born at Durham, County Durham.

Hedley represented the Durham Cricket Board in 3 List A matches in the 1999 NatWest Trophy, against Oxfordshire, Staffordshire and Gloucestershire.  In his 3 List A matches, he scored 54 runs at a batting average of 18.00, with a high score of 46.  In the field he also took a single catch.

References

External links
Adrian Hedley at Cricinfo
Adrian Hedley at CricketArchive

1978 births
Living people
Sportspeople from Durham, England
Cricketers from County Durham
English cricketers
Durham Cricket Board cricketers